Fast Times may refer to:

Entertainment

Film and television
Fast Times at Ridgemont High, a 1982 coming-of-age comedy drama film
Fast Times, a 1986 American television series
"Fast Times at Buddy Cianci Jr. High", a 2005 episode of Family Guy
"Fast Times", the second episode of the first season of Continuum, 2012

Music
"Fast Times", a 2008 song by One Buck Short
Fast Times at Barrington High, a 2008 album by American rock band The Academy Is...
"Fast Times at Clairemont High", a 2010 song by Pierce the Veil from Selfish Machines
"Fast Times", a 2022 song by Sabrina Carpenter

Literature
 Fast Times at Fairmont High, a novella by Vernor Vinge